Vinegar Joe may mean:

nickname for Joseph Stilwell, US general
Vinegar Joe (band)